Penelope May "Penny" Driver (born 20 February 1952) is an Anglican priest.

Driver was educated at Manchester University and ordained deacon in 1987 and priest in 1994.  She began her ordained ministry as a curate in  Cullercoats and the  Newcastle Diocesan Youth Advisor. After this, she was Youth Chaplain for the Diocese of Ripon from 1988 to 1996  and then  its Assistant Director of Ordinands from 1996 to 1998; and director from then until 2006, when she became Archdeacon of Exeter. In 2011, she was appointed Archdeacon of Westmorland and Furness. She retired in late 2016.

References
 

 

1952 births
Alumni of the University of Manchester
Archdeacons of Exeter
Archdeacons of Westmorland and Furness
Living people